Lymecycline is a tetracycline broad-spectrum antibiotic. It is approximately 5,000 times more soluble than tetracycline base and is unique amongst tetracyclines in that it is absorbed by an active transport process across the intestinal wall, making use of the same  fast and efficient mechanism by which carbohydrates are absorbed.

The greater absorption of lymecycline allows for lower dosages to be used; the standard dose of 408 mg is equivalent to 300 mg tetracycline base and, in its action, to 500 mg tetracycline hydrochloride. Lymecycline, unlike tetracycline hydrochloride, is soluble at all physiological pH values.

History
Lymecycline was introduced by Farmitalia in 1963.

Indications
Lymecycline, like other tetracyclines, is used to treat a range of infections.  Its better absorption profile makes it preferable to tetracycline for moderately severe acne and typically prescribed for 8 weeks at a time, but alternatives should be sought if no improvement occurs by 3 months.

Side effects 
Lymecycline's side effects can include rash, headache, diarrhoea, nausea, vomiting, dermatitis, inflammation of the liver, hypersensitive reactions, and visual disturbances. When taken for a long period of time, it can cause reflux oesophagitis. Recently, the family of tetracycline antibiotics has been associated with thyroid dysfunction in youth.

See also 
 Timeline of antibiotics

References 

Amino acid derivatives
Anti-acne preparations
Tetracycline antibiotics